The League of Corinth, also referred to as the Hellenic League (from Greek Ἑλληνικός  Hellenikos, "pertaining to Greece and Greeks"), was a confederation of Greek states created by Philip II in 338–337 BC. The League was created in order to unify Greek military forces under Macedonian leadership (hegemony) in their combined conquest of the Persian Achaemenid Empire. 

King Philip was initially urged by Isocrates (in Isocrates' Philippus oration), in 346 BC, to unify Greece against the Persians. After the Battle of Chaeronea, the league became controlled by King Philip.

The title 'League of Corinth' was invented by modern historians because the first council of the League took place in Corinth, and the Greek word synedrion is better translated as congress or conference rather than league. The organization was the first time in history that the Greek city-states (with the notable exception of Sparta, which would join only later under Alexander's terms) would unify under a single political entity.

Organization
The League was governed by the Hegemon (strategos autokrator in a military context), the Synedrion  (council) and the Dikastai (judges). Decrees of the league were issued in Corinth, Athens, Delphi, Olympia and Pydna. The League maintained an army levied from member states in approximate proportion to their size, while Philip established Hellenic garrisons (commanded by phrourarchs, or garrison commanders) in Corinth, Thebes, Pydna and Ambracia.

Treaty of the Common Peace
(A fragmentary inscription found in Athens)

Text

Translation

The League during the Alexandrian campaigns
The decision for the destruction of Thebes as transgressor of the above oath was taken by the council of the League of Corinth by a large majority. Beyond the violation of the oath, the council judged that the Thebans were thus finally punished for their betrayal of the Greeks during the Persian Wars. The League is mentioned by Arrian (I, 16, 7), after the Battle of Granicus (334 BC). Alexander sent 300 panoplies to the temple of Pallas Athena in Athens, with the following inscription. 

Also, Diodorus Siculus (Βίβλος ΙΖ’ 48.[6]) mentions the Council's decision in 333 BC, after the Battle of Issus, to send ambassadors to Alexander that will bring the Excellence of Greece (Golden Wreath). During 331 BC after the Battle of Megalopolis, Sparta appealed to Alexander for terms, to which he agreed on condition that the Lacedaemonians now joined the League of Corinth. During the Asiatic campaign, Antipater was appointed deputy hegemon of the League while Alexander personally recommended that the Athenians turn their attention to things; in case something happened to him, Athens would take over the power in Greece.

Aftermath
The League was dissolved after the Lamian War (322 BC). During 302 BC Antigonus I Monophthalmus and his son Demetrius Poliorcetes tried to revive the federation against Cassander. Antigonus III Doson (king of Macedon from 229 BC to 221 BC) also revived the League against Sparta during 224 BC.

See also
Koinon
Hellenic League (disambiguation)
Macedonia (ancient kingdom)

References

330s BC establishments
Ancient Greek hegemonic leagues
Military history of ancient Greece
Former international organizations
Macedonia (ancient kingdom)
4th-century BC military alliances
Greek city-state federations